KWEM may refer to:

 KWEM-LP, a low-power radio station (93.3 FM) licensed to serve West Memphis, Arkansas, United States
 KWAM, a radio station in Memphis, Tennessee, United States, that used the call letters KWEM from 1947 to 1959
 KWEM-LP (Oklahoma), a defunct low-power television station (channel 31) formerly licensed to serve Stillwater, Oklahoma, United States